The Police of Republika Srpska() is the executive and operative agency of the Ministry of Interior of Republika Srpska, and is headquartered in Banja Luka.

Duties and law regulations of police officers 
Police officers are uniformed members of the Ministry of Interior and its executive agency that act objectively to the Constitution, laws, and other regulations of Republika Srpska. There is a group of women in the Ministry of Interior that focuses on providing better conditions for female officers. Besides the uniform, every police officer has an ID card and badge that must be shown when required. Law about police officers (Закон о полицијским службеницима, Zakon o policijskim službenicima) gives regulations to police officers.

History 

After the fall of communist Yugoslavia, most institutions, including the Ministry of Interior and Special Unit, were disbanded. The Police of Republika Srpska was founded on April 4, 1992, when the Ministry of Interior established the Special Anti-Terrorist Unit.

After a conflict between Bosniak police forces, Croats, and police forces of Republika Srpska, special units from the Ministry of Interior of Republika Srpska fought and won on April 5, 1992, when Serb police officers wanted to enter a school. Two police officers were killed in action (Mile Lizdek and Milorad Pupić), three wounded (Duško Jević, Miodrag Repija, and Risto Lubura) and one was injured (Miroslav Marić). Three Serb civilians were killed in action by Bosniaks and two were wounded. The first police parade was organized in Banja Luka on May 12, 1992. The Special Anti-Terrorist Unit participated in the Bosnian War. Most of its members were volunteers, or members from the Army of Republika Srpska or police reserves.

After the war, the Ministry of Interior and the Police of Republika Srpska were planned to be merged into the Ministry of Interior of Bosnia and Herzegovina and the Police of Bosnia and Herzegovina, and the merge happened in 2006. The police force was criticized: its uniform was deemed to be "the same as Ustaše uniform" and was called a "drug-dealing and criminal organization" (said mostly by Dragan Mektić). In 2018, a member of the Serb Democratic Party fired a projectile from a M80 Zolja at the Agrama building in Banja Luka to blame the Police of Republika Srpska and Ministry for the incident. 

A plan to form a reserve of Police of Republika Srpska (comprising 20% of the force) was proposed to protect borders and citizens to address the migrant crisis, though it was replaced with the formation of the Gendarmerie of Republika Srpska.

Organisation

Director of Police 
The head of the police is the director (Директор полиције, Direktor policije). The director's responsibility is to control, conduct, supervise and plan all police activities, consolidate police work, make decisions about police employers, and report to the Minister of Interior and the government.

Administration of the Police 
The Administration of the Police (Serbian: Управа полиције, Uprava policije) is the organizational unit of the Police of Republika Srpska, and is responsible for work coordination; following and directing police administrations, police stations, the Gendarmerie, traffic security police stations; helping carry out police missions; following public order and peacekeeping and traffic security situations; tracking and analyzing traffic penalties; lesson organization; participating in emergency security shifts; inspecting and controlling police work; making teaching plans; and cooperating with other institutions. The administration has its chief, currently Dalibor Ivanić.

Police administrations 

The police is geographically organized into ten administrations (policijske uprave): Banja Luka, Prijedor, Mrkonjić Grad, Gradiška, Doboj, Bijeljina, Zvornik, East Sarajevo, Foča and Trebinje. Each police administration is headed by a chief of police administration.

Police Administration Banja Luka 
Police Administration Banja Luka (Полицијска управа Бања Лука, Policijska uprava Banja Luka, short ПУ БЛ, PU BL) is located in the Banja Luka region, and it contains the City of Banja Luka, Laktaši, Čelinac, Kotor Varoš, Kneževo, and Prnjavor municipalities. There are 12 police stations (six of them are in Banja Luka).

Police Station for Interventions 
Police Station for Interventions of the Police Administration Banja Luka (Serbian: Полицијска станица за интервенције, Policijska stanica za intervencije) is the only police station of its kind in Bosnia and Herzegovina. The station was founded in 2008 and it has 38 police officers that work in this station. Police officers of this police station are known because of the Dacia Dusters they drive in.

Police Administration Prijedor 
Police Administration Prijedor (Serbian: Полицијска управа Приједор, Policijska uprava Prijedor, short ПУ ПД, PU PD) is located in the Prijedor region, and it contains the City of Prijedor, Kozarska Dubica, Kostajnica, Novi Grad, Krupa na Uni, and Oštra Luka municipalities. There are ten police stations.

Police Administration Mrkonjić Grad 
Police Administration Mrkonjić Grad (Serbian: Полицијска управа Мркоњић Град, Policijska uprava Mrkonjić Grad, short ПУ МГ, PU MG) is located in the Mrkonjić Grad region. and it contains seven municipalities: Mrkonjić Grad, Ribnik, Šipovo, Jezero, Petrovac, East Drvar, and Kupres (RS). There are five police stations.

Police Administration Gradiška 
Police Administration Gradiška (Serbian: Полицијска управа Градишка, Policijska uprava Gradiška, short ПУ ГР, PU GR) was formed in 2017 in the Gradiška region. It contains two municipalities: City of Gradiška and Srbac. There are four police stations.

Police Administration Doboj 
Police Administration Doboj (Serbian: Полицијска управа Добој, Policijska uprava Doboj, short ПУ ДО, PU DO) is located in the Doboj region. Othern than Šamac, it administers for the City of Doboj and the Stanari, Teslić, Petrovo, Derventa, Modriča, Vukosavlje, and Brod municipalities. There are nine police stations.

Police Administration Bijeljina 
Police Administration Bijeljina (Serbian: Полицијска управа Бијељина, Policijska uprava Bijeljina, short ПУ БН, PU BN) oversees Bijeljina, Ugljevik, Lopare, Šamac, Donji Žabar, and Pelagićevo. It has eight police stations.

Police Administration Zvornik 
Police Administration Zvornik (Serbian: Полицијска управа Зворник, Policijska uprava Zvornik, short ПУ ЗВ, PU ZV) is located in the Zvornik region. It oversees Zvornik, Osmaci, Šekovići, Vlasenica, Milići, Srebrenica, and Bratunac. There are nine police stations.

Police Administration Istočno Sarajevo 
Police Administration Istočno Sarajevo (Serbian: Полицијска управа Источно Сарајево, Policijska uprava Istočno Sarajevo, short ПУ ИС, PU IS) administers the Istočno Sarajevo and municipalities Rogatica and Han Pijesak. There are nine police stations.

Police Administration Foča 
Police Administration Foča (Serbian: Полицијска управа Фоча, Policijska uprava Foča, short ПУ ФО, PU FO) was formed in 2017 in the Foča region, and administers Foča, Čajniče, Novo Goražde, Višegrad, Rudo, and Kalinovik). It has seven police stations.

Police Administration Trebinje 
Police Administration Trebinje (Serbian: Полицијска управа Требиње, Policijska uprava Trebinje, short ПУ ТБ, PU TB) is located to the south of Republika Srpska and has seven police stations. It oversees Trebinje, Ljubinje, Berkovići, East Mostar, Nevesinje, Gacko, and Bileća.

Crime Police Administration 
Crime Police Administration (Serbian: Управа криминалистичке полиције, Uprava kriminalističke policije) is an administration whose duties include processing most complex crimes; controlling, supervising, and directing activities of all organizational parts and support units of crime police; detecting criminal offences; fighting narcotics producing and trafficking; suggesting and determining deadlines of police administration obligations; monitoring, studying and analyzing situations, crime activity, forensic techinques, crime-intelligence analyses, and special operative duties; finding and arresting criminal offenders; providing criminal evidence; publishing arrest warrants and sub-law documents; cooperating with other state organizations; and acting on relevant information by security intelligence services. The administration has two units: General Crime Unit (Јединица за општи криминалитет, Jedinica za opšti kriminalitet) and Economy Crime Unit (Јединица за привредни криминалитет, Jedinica za privredni kriminalitet).

Organized and Serious Crime Administration  
Organized and Serious Crime Administration (Serbian: Управа за организовани и тешки криминалитет, Uprava za organizovani i teški kriminalitet) is an administration with duties to prevent, detect and investigate criminal offences defined by Counter Corruption, Organized and Serious Crime Law; collect intelligence information and evidences about crimes; analyze security levels; organize and govern actions against most complex and serious criminal offences and their offenders; cooperate with other state organizations; and assist other police administrations. This police administration has four units: Counter Organized Crime and Narcotics Unit (Јединица за организовани криминалитет и дроге, Jedinica za organizovani kriminalitet i droge), Special Affairs Unit (Јединица за специјалне послове, Jedinica za specijalne poslove), Unit for Operative Analytics (Јединица за оперативну аналитику, Jedinica za operativnu analitiku), and Unit for Operative Support (Јединица за оперативну подршку, Jedinica za operativnu podršku).

Counter Terrorism and Extremism Administration  
Counter Terrorism and Extremism Administration (Serbian: Управа за борбу против тероризма и екстремизма, Uprava za borbu protiv terorizma i ekstremizma) processes criminal offences in field of terrorism and extremism, war crimes and criminal offences according to International Humanitarian Law, for needs of analytic investigations uses all usable data bases of the Ministry and also all public informations, follows realization, studies and analyzes situation and moving of crimes and use of crime-intelligence analysises, crime-technical methods and special operative affairs, prepares sub-law documents that regulate acting against terrorism and extremism and cooperates with other state organs. The administration has two units: Counter Terrorism and Extremism Unit (Јединица за борбу против тероризма и екстремизма, Jedinica za borbu protiv terorizma i ekstremizma) and Prevention and Analytics Unit (Јединица за превенцију и аналитику, Jedinica za prevenciju i analitiku).

Police Support Administration 
Police Support Administration (Serbian: Управа за полицијску подршку, Uprava za policijsku podršku) is a police administration that improves legal action and work of suborganizations under the Ministry, works on certain operative-instructive duties, educates preventively police officers, monitors laws and regulations linked with police affairs, helps to other police organization parts and coordinates with them, monitors legal acting of police structures, coordinates, monitors and collects informations against crimes (particularly high technology crimes), collects crime intelligence data, and helps other police administrations. The administration has three units: Coordination Unit (Јединица за координацију, Jedinica za koordinaciju), Operative Support Unit (Јединица за оперативну подршку, Jedinica za operativnu podršku) and Forensics Unit – Crime Technical Center (Јединица за форензику – Криминалистичко-технички центар, Jedinica za forenziku – Kriminalističko-tehnički centar).

Administration for Protecting Persons and Objects 
The Administration for Protecting Persons and Objects (Serbian: Управа за обезбјеђење личности и објеката, Uprava za obezbjeđenje ličnosti i objekata) duties include: monitoring, directing and coordinating of units in its structure, police administrations, police stations and Support Unit in duties of business protection; organizing and performing special security of persons and objects that are decreed by the government or minister, protecting foreign persons and delegations while in Republika Srpska; monitoring security situation of objects and persons; establishing data collecting systems for operative and preventative protection; controlling and making plans for protection; taking anti-terrorist protective measures; making direct connection between cabinets and protocols that are protected by administration members; and overseeing police officers' professional improvement and education and material-technical equipment. It was formerly called the Unit for Protecting Persons and Objects until 2013.

Units 
All units of police are under the control and command of the Minister of Interior and Director of Police. Units of police are:  
Policija opšte namjene (General purpose police)
Saobraćajna policija (Traffic police)
Posebne snage policije (Special police forces)
Kriminalistička policija (Crime police)
Žandarmerija (Gendarmery)
Specijalna antiteroristička jedinica (Special Anti-Terrorist Unit)

New units 
New units formed in police and Ministry of Interior are the Honour Unit (Почасна јединица Министарства унутрашњих послова Републике Српске) and the Police Orchestra (Полицијски оркестар Министарства унутрашњих послова Републике Српске).

Uniforms and ranks 
Regulations about uniforms (parts of uniform, look, colours, and material) are given by the minister as recommended by the director.

Uniform and ranks today 

Uniforms had changed several times. Last time ranks and uniform were changed in 2018 when blue peaked cap with a blue-white checkered ribbon as those in London Metropolitan Police replaced the field cap. New police ranks added are: 
 mlađi policajac (junior police officer), policajac (police officer), viši policajac (senior police officer), samostalni policajac (independent police officer), glavni policajac (chief police officer), 
 mlađi inspektor (junior inspector), inspektor (inspector), viši inspektor (senior inspector), samostalni inspektor (independent inspector), 
 glavni inspektor (chief inspector), generalni inspektor policije (general inspector of police), glavni generalni inspektor policije (chief general inspector of police).

Director of police is always the chief general inspector of police and after the end of their duties as director, they are moved back to their previous rank.

<noinclude>

Former ranks and uniforms

2014–2018 

Most of the uniform is linked with former police uniforms. Peaked caps were replaced by blue field caps. All metal parts of previous uniform were replaced with textile parts as for example emblem on cap. The emblem was shown on the right arm for the first time and the officer's name badge was placed on the chest. Before 2018 ranks were conceived in 2004 and were the same in every police agency in Bosnia and Herzegovina; only high inspector was changed because of changes to the republic's coat of arms. Former ranks were: 
 policajac (police officer), viši policajac (senior police officer), narednik (sergeant), viši narednik (senior sergeant),
 mlađi inspektor (junior inspector), inspektor (inspector), viši inspektor (senior inspector), samostalni inspektor (independent inspector), 
 glavni inspektor (chief inspector), generalni inspektor policije (general inspector of police), glavni generalni inspektor policije (chief general inspector of police).

2004–2014 

The names of ranks in this period are the same as 2014 to 2018. The symbols of Republika Srpska changed: the former coat of arms of Republika Srpska with the double-headed eagle replaced the Seal of Republika Srpska. The financial crisis of 2007–2008 prevented the Ministry of Interior from changing old uniforms of police officers. In that time, the police had 4.400 officers on street with old uniforms. Uniforms of that time became a symbol for the Police of Republika Srpska. The uniform's cap had a metal insignia, arm patch on only one arm, neckties, they did not have any kind of identification; at one time the police badge was on the left breast.

1998–2003 
A decision to modernize the look of the army and police was made after the war. In 1998 the Ministry of Interior started with improving the Framework Agreement for Restructuring, Reform and Democratization of the Police of Republika Srpska (Serbian: Okvirni sporazum o restrukturisanju, reformi i demokratizaciji Policije Republike Srpske), and aside from changing laws, regulations, and organizations, the ministry also changed the look of uniforms and ranks of the police. Ranks were: 
 učenik prve godine SŠUP (first-year student of the Secondary School of the Interior), učenik druge godine SŠUP (second-year student of the Secondary School of Interior), učenik treće godine SŠUP (third-year student of the Secondary School of the Interior), učenik četvrte godine SŠUP (fourth-year student of the Secondary School of the Interior);
 student prve godine VŠUP (first-year student of the Higher School of the Interior), student druge godine VŠUP (second-year student of the Higher School of the Interior), učenik treće godine VŠUP (third-year student of the Higher School of the Interior);
 policajac pripravnik (police officer trainee), pripravnik sa višom školskom spremom (higher educated police officer trainee), pripravnik sa visokom školskom spremom (high educated police officer trainee), policajac (police officer), vođa sektora (police sector leader), vođa sektora prve kategorije (1st category sector leader), komandir staničnog odjeljenja policije (commandeer of station police department),
 pomoćnik komandira policijske stanice (police station commandeer assistant), zamjenik komandira policijske stanice (police station commandeer deputy), komandir policijske stanice (police station commandeer), operativni dežurni DOC-a MUP-a (operative sentry of the Duty Operative Center of the Ministry of Interior),
 inspektor policije centra javne bezbjednosti (police inspector of center of public security), šef odsjeka u odjeljenju policije u centru javne bezbjednosti (detachment chief in police department in center of public security), načelnik odjeljenja policije centra javne bezbjednosti (police department chief of center of public security), načelnik sektora policije centra javne bezbjednosti (police sector chief of center of public security),
 načelnik DOC-a MUP-a (chief of Duty Operative Center of the Ministry of Interior), načelnik odjeljenja uprave policije (department of the Police Administration chief), zamjenik načelnika Službe specijalne policije(Special Police Service chief deputy), načelnik Službe specijalne policije (Special Police Service chief), 
 načelnik centra javne bezbjednosti (center of public security chief), načelnik uprave (police administration chief), zamjenik ministra unutrašnjih poslova (minister of interior deputy), ministar unutrašnjih poslova (minister of interior).

1992–1998 

In the beginning of the war, the Police of the Republika Srpska mainly had the same uniform as the Yugoslav Militsiya. The Special Police Detachment had camouflage uniforms with blue lizard pattern and also sometimes even uniforms with military camouflage pattern. Ranks in this period were similar to military ranks:
 non-commissioned officers: mlađi narednik (junior sergeant), mlađi narednik prve klase (first class junior sergeant), narednik (sergeant), narednik prve klase (first class sergeant), stariji narednik (senior sergeant), stariji narednik prve klase (first class senior sergeant),
 officers: potporučnik (second lieutenant), poručnik (lieutenant), kapetan (captain), kapetan prve klase (first class captain), major (major), potpukovnik (lieutenant colonel), pukovnik (colonel),
 generals: general-major (major general), general-potpukovnik (lieutenant colonel general), general-pukovnik (colonel general).

Education 

Police officers in Republika Srpska are educated in several institutions and units. Usually, all the police officers during education belong to the Administration for police training. Educational institutions that officers attend are Police Academy and Faculty of Security Sciences.

Secondary School of the Interior  
Secondary School of the Interior (Serbian: Средња школа унутрашњих послова, Srednja škola unutrašnjih poslova) was founded on September 9, 1992, as an organization unit of the Ministry of Interior for education and professional training of new police forces in Republika Srpska. Education took four years. It was part of the center for education of staff of the Interior. There was also a six-month long course for civilians that wanted to become police officers.

Police Academy 
Police Academy (Serbian: Полицијска академија, Policijska akademija) was founded on July 2, 1999, by the Government of Republika Srpska. Teaching started on July 19, 1999. The duties of the Police Academy are professional education and training. Today education is based on Unit for Police Training (Јединица за полицијску обуку, Jedinica za policijsku obuku). The unit has its chief (načelnik). The academy belongs to the Administration for Police Training and it is a suborganization of the Ministry of Interior. Students of the academy are called cadets.

There is also the Unit for Professional Improvement (Јединица за стручно усавршавање, Jedinica za stručno usavršavanje). The unit has two detachments: 
 Detachment for Special Training (Одјељење за специјализовану обуку, Odjeljenje za specijalizovanu obuku), whose duties include planning and organizing of special training, and acquiring knowledge and skills using special training
 Detachment for Professional Improvement (Одјељење за стручно усавршавање, Odjeljenje za stručno usavršavanje)

Faculty of Security Sciences 
The Faculty of Security Sciences (Serbian: Факултет безбједносних наука, Fakultet bezbjednosnih nauka) was founded on July 1, 1995 as the High School of the Interior (or Higher School of the Interior, on Serbian: Виша школа унутрашњих послова, Viša škola unutrašnjih poslova) which began operations on November 21, 1995. The curriculum took five semesters, and graduates were given the title of jurist of internal affairs. On July 23, 2002, it became the College of the Interior (Висока школа унутрашњих послова, Visoka škola unutrašnjih poslova) and operation began on October 1, 2002. It was later renamed the Faculty of Security Sciences and became the eighteenth organization of the University of Banja Luka in 2017.

Peace missions 
Affairs connected with peacekeeping operations are linked with the Interpolice Cooperation Detachment of the Minister Service. Officers of the Police of Republika Srpska have participated in UN peacekeeping missions since 2000. For police officers in Srpska that are interested in peacekeeping missions there are several requirements: eight years of effective work in police service for male officers and five years for females, proficiency in the English language, good physical and mental health, and the possession of the B category driving license. To access training, police officers need to demonstrate good English language knowledge and computer skills. Afterwards, they have two tests: pre-mission training and the SAAT test. Police officers of Republika Srpska participate participate in various international peacekeeping missions:
 United Nations Mission of Support to East Timor (UNMISET),
 United Nations Mission in Liberia (UNMIL),
 United Nations Peacekeeping Force in Cyprus (UNFICYP),
 United Nations Mission in Sudan (UNMIS),
 United Nations Mission in South Sudan (UNMISS) and
 MONUSCO. 
In 2018 there were 11 police officers all around the world in peacekeeping missions. Their duties included assisting local police, trainings, and consultations.

Non-professional activities 
Besides standard police duties, most officers are involved in other activities. They have their own futsal club, KMF Policajac. It was part of the second futsal league of Republika Srpska – West of Football Association of Republika Srpska and in 2018–19 was ranked in first place. Police officers participated in the 2011 World Police Indoor Soccer Tournament in Eibergen, Netherlands, where they won second place.

Gallery

See also
 Republika Srpska
 Gendarmerie (Republika Srpska)

References

Law enforcement agencies of Bosnia and Herzegovina
 
Organizations based in Republika Srpska